Sonake is a village in Koregaon Taluka of Satara district in Maharashtra state, India.

References

Villages in Satara district